"Command button" may refer to:

 A graphical button that appears in a computer user interface, allowing a user to trigger an event
 Keyboard buttons (generally)
 The "command" key on Apple keyboards (a modifier key with a "⌘" symbol printed on it)

See also
 Push-button